2014 Malta Open is a darts tournament, which took place in Malta in 2014.

Results

Last 32

Last 16

References

2014 in darts
2014 in Maltese sport
Darts in Malta